The 2004 United States House elections in Pennsylvania was an election for Pennsylvania's delegation to the United States House of Representatives, which occurred as part of the general election of the House of Representatives on November 2, 2004.

General election

See also
 United States congressional delegations from Pennsylvania

References

2004 Pennsylvania elections
2004